Roger Yasukawa (born October 10, 1977) is an American-born Japanese former auto racing driver. He was born in Los Angeles, California, but holds Japanese citizenship.

Yasukawa started karting in Southern California, winning the California State Championship in 1991 in Junior Sportsman. He then moved to Italy to compete in JICA. He moved to car racing in 1997 in the Formula Vauxhall Junior Championship in England, before winning the West Coast Skip Barber Formula Dodge 2-Liter Championship in 1998. He moved back to the UK to compete in the inaugural Formula Palmer Audi Championship, before driving several years in the Barber Dodge Pro Series before moving up to the Toyota Atlantic championship in 2002 as a teammate to Ryan Hunter-Reay. He finished 10th in points.

Yasukawa signed to drive for former Formula One driver Aguri Suzuki's new Indy Racing League team in 2003. He was second to future series champion Dan Wheldon in the rookie-of-the-year standings and 12th overall, with 8 top-10 finishes.  He ran only two races for Rahal Letterman Racing in 2004 but finished 10th both times.  He struggled on a return to a full-time seat in 2005 for the underfunded Dreyer & Reinbold Racing.

Yaskuawa has only made occasional IRL appearances since 2006. He drove in the 2006 Indianapolis 500 for Playa Del Racing and finished 16th.  He was a late entry for the 2007 event, running in Dreyer and Reinbold's third car, alongside 2004 Indianapolis 500 champion Buddy Rice and Sarah Fisher. In 2008 he contested the Motegi round as well as the 2008 Indianapolis 500, for Beck Motorsports, however he failed to qualify for Indy.

In 2007, Yasukawa drove the #11 SAMAX Motorsport Daytona Prototype at Infineon Raceway, finishing 17th.

Yasukawa currently works in driver management, representing drivers both in the United States and Japan. He was instrumental in bringing Spaniard Alex Palou to IndyCar from Japan and secured a deal between Team Goh and Dale Coyne Racing for Palou to debut in the IndyCar series. Yasukawa was then able to secure Palou a drive with Chip Ganassi Racing the following year, which helped Palou become a title contender and eventual champion of the 2021 IndyCar Series.

Motorsports Career Results

American open–wheel racing results
(key)

Barber Dodge Pro Series

Atlantic Championship

IndyCar Series

 1 Run on same day.

Indy 500 results

References

External links

Roger Yasukawa official website  - in Japanese

1977 births
Living people
Racing drivers from Los Angeles
IndyCar Series drivers
Indianapolis 500 drivers
Atlantic Championship drivers
Formula Palmer Audi drivers
American sportspeople of Japanese descent
Barber Pro Series drivers
Team Aguri drivers
Rahal Letterman Lanigan Racing drivers
Dreyer & Reinbold Racing drivers
Conquest Racing drivers